Bestovje is a village located west of Zagreb, Croatia, near Sveta Nedelja, Zagreb County. The population is 2,402 (census 2011).
It has existed as a standalone settlement since 1910.

References

Populated places in Zagreb County